The 1994–95 Nationalliga A season was the 57th season of the Nationalliga A, the top level of ice hockey in Switzerland. 10 teams participated in the league, and EHC Kloten won the championship.

Regular season

Playoffs

Quarterfinals
EV Zug - Zurcher SC 3-2 on series
HC Fribourg-Gotteron - HC Davos 3-2 on series
HC Ambri-Piotta - SC Bern 0-3 on series
EHC Kloten - HC Lugano 3-2 on series

Semifinals
EV Zug - HC Fribourg-Gotteron 3-0 on series
SC Bern - EHC Kloten 0-3 on series

Final
EV Zug - EHC Kloten 1-3 on series

Playouts

External links
 Championnat de Suisse 1994/95 

1994–95 in Swiss ice hockey
Swiss